Mount Zeppelin is an Antarctic mountain, 1,265 m, standing 3 miles (4.8 km) southeast of Eckener Point on Pefaur (Ventimiglia) Peninsula, Danco Coast on the west coast of Graham Land. It surmounts Poduene Glacier to the north. Mount Zeppelin was charted by the Belgian Antarctic Expedition under Gerlache, 1897–99. Named by the United Kingdom Antarctic Place-Names Committee (UK-APC) in 1960 for Count Ferdinand von Zeppelin (1838-1917), German aeronautical engineer who perfected the large-scale rigid airship, 1894–1917.

Map
 British Antarctic Territory.  Scale 1:200000 topographic map. DOS 610 Series, Sheet W 64 60.  Directorate of Overseas Surveys, Tolworth, UK, 1978.

References
 SCAR Composite Gazetteer of Antarctica.

Mountains of Graham Land
Danco Coast